The following list is the scheduled issues for year 2010. The schedule is subject to change without prior notice from the National Bank of Poland.

See also

 Numismatics
 Regular issue coinage
 Coin grading

References

Commemorative coins of Poland